Cindy Elizabeth Eksteen (born 21 November 1977) is a South African former cricketer who played as a right-handed batter and right-arm fast-medium bowler. She appeared in one Test match and 36 One Day Internationals for South Africa between 1997 and 2004, including captaining the side in 1999 and 2002. She played domestic cricket for Free State, North West, Northerns and Easterns.

References

External links
 
 

1977 births
Living people
People from Vryheid
South African women cricketers
South Africa women Test cricketers
South Africa women One Day International cricketers
South Africa women's national cricket team captains
Free State women cricketers
North West women cricketers
Northerns women cricketers
Easterns women cricketers